A year-in-review is any sort of publication which is traditionally released on an annual basis to cover the events of the past year from the perspective of the contributors to the publication. Years-in-review are often intended to highlight the highs and lows of the events which occurred throughout the year, and often include select works published during the year which are considered by the editors of the year-in-review to be the most memorable works of the year. Years-in-review are often used to list "Top Ten" lists voted upon by hired critics and reviewers of other media.

On broadcast media, years-in-review (also called "Countdowns") are segments of regular series or annual specials which offer mini-documentaries summarizing the highs and lows of the prior year.

Non-entertainment
Outside of strictly-news and entertainment-oriented media, the term "year-in-review" can also apply to any statistical internal overview of an organization's performance in comparison to prior years of operation.

Publications by format